Vakalopoulos is a Greek surname. Notable people with the name include:

 Apostolos Vakalopoulos (1909–2000), Greek historian
 Michalis Vakalopoulos (born 1990), Dutch-Greek footballer
 Pagonis Vakalopoulos (born 1965), Greek footballer

Greek-language surnames
Surnames